Clark County is a county in the U.S. state of South Dakota. As of the 2020 census, the population was 3,837. Its county seat is Clark. The county was created in 1873 and organized in 1881. It was named for Newton Clark, a Dakota Territory legislator in 1873.

Geography
Clark County terrain consists of rolling hills, dotted with lakes and ponds especially in the east central portion. The area is mostly devoted to agriculture.

Major highways

 U.S. Highway 212
 South Dakota Highway 20
 South Dakota Highway 25
 South Dakota Highway 28

Adjacent counties

 Day County - north
 Codington County - east
 Hamlin County - southeast
 Kingsbury County - south
 Beadle County - southwest
 Spink County - west

Protected areas

 Christopherson State Public Shooting Area
 Dry Lake Number Two State Public Shooting Area
 Fordham State Public Shooting Area
 McPeek State Public Shooting Area
 Stairs Slough State Public Shooting Area
 Willow Lake State Public Shooting Area

Lakes and reservoirs

 Baileys Lake
 Dry Lake Number One
 Dry Lake Number Two
 Mud Lake
 Reid Lake
 Swan Lake
 Willow Lake

Demographics

2000 census
As of the 2000 United States Census, there were 4,143 people, 1,598 households, and 1,110 families in the county. The population density was 4 people per square mile (2/km2). There were 1,880 housing units at an average density of 2 per square mile (1/km2). The racial makeup of the county was 98.65% White, 0.07% Black or African American, 0.60% Native American, 0.10% Asian, 0.02% Pacific Islander, 0.19% from other races, and 0.36% from two or more races. 0.48% of the population were Hispanic or Latino of any race. 44.2% were of German, 24.9% Norwegian and 5.0% English ancestry.

There were 1,598 households, out of which 29.30% had children under the age of 18 living with them, 61.60% were married couples living together, 4.70% had a female householder with no husband present, and 30.50% were non-families. 28.10% of all households were made up of individuals, and 16.40% had someone living alone who was 65 years of age or older. The average household size was 2.54 and the average family size was 3.14.

The county population contained 27.00% under the age of 18, 5.80% from 18 to 24, 22.00% from 25 to 44, 23.00% from 45 to 64, and 22.20% who were 65 years of age or older. The median age was 42 years. For every 100 females there were 97.40 males. For every 100 females age 18 and over, there were 97.40 males.

The median income for a household in the county was $30,208, and the median income for a family was $35,559. Males had a median income of $24,421 versus $19,543 for females. The per capita income for the county was $15,597. About 10.90% of families and 14.80% of the population were below the poverty line, including 20.10% of those under age 18 and 16.00% of those age 65 or over.

2010 census
As of the 2010 United States Census, there were 3,691 people, 1,445 households, and 929 families residing in the county. The racial makeup of the county was 98.1% white, 0.2% black or African American, 0.1% Asian, 0.1% American Indian, 0.8% from other races, and 0.8% from two or more races. Those of Hispanic or Latino origin made up 1.7% of the population. In terms of ancestry, 52.0% were German, 29.4% were Norwegian, 9.7% were Irish, 7.8% were English, 5.4% were Swedish, and 3.5% were American.

Of the 1,445 households, 23.0% had children under the age of 18 living with them, 55.8% were married couples living together, 4.8% had a female householder with no husband present, 35.7% were non-families, and 32.5% of all households were made up of individuals. The average household size was 2.22 and the average family size was 2.79. The median age was 45.7 years.

The median income for a household in the county was $43,894 and the median income for a family was $55,575. Males had a median income of $33,606 versus $24,952 for females. The per capita income for the county was $23,909. About 7.5% of families and 13.1% of the population were below the poverty line, including 24.5% of those under age 18 and 12.6% of those age 65 or over.

Communities

Cities
Clark (county seat)
Willow Lake

Towns

Bradley
Garden City
Naples
Raymond
Vienna

Census-designated place

 Collins Colony
 Crocker
 Fordham Colony
 Hillcrest Colony
 Mayfield Colony
 Silver Lake Colony

Unincorporated communities
Carpenter
Elrod

Townships

Ash
Blaine
Collins
Cottonwood
Darlington
Day
Eden
Fordham
Foxton
Garfield
Hague
Lake
Lincoln
Logan
Maydell
Merton
Mount Pleasant
Pleasant
Raymond
Richland
Rosedale
Spring Valley
Thorp
Warren
Washington
Woodland

Politics
Clark county is reliably Republican.

See also
National Register of Historic Places listings in Clark County, South Dakota

References

 
1881 establishments in Dakota Territory
Populated places established in 1881